Óscar Arriaza (born 30 January 1956) is a Chilean footballer. He played in eight matches for the Chile national football team in 1983. He was also part of Chile's squad for the 1983 Copa América tournament.

References

External links
 

1956 births
Living people
Chilean footballers
Chile international footballers
Place of birth missing (living people)
Association football forwards